Area Q. (Área Q in Brazilian Portuguese) is a 2011 American-Brazilian science fiction film directed by Gerson Sanginitto and starring Isaiah Washington, Tania Khalill, and Murilo Rosa. It was shot in Los Angeles and multiple locations in the Brazilian state of Ceará.

Plot
The film follows the story of Thomas Mathews, a well-known and award-winning reporter who suffers a big impact with the disappearance of his son.  A year later, Thomas has not discovered anything about the kidnapping and remains obsessed with it to the point of being about to lose his home and his job.

In order to help him, his boss offers a special project, in which the journalist must investigate cases of UFO sightings, close encounters of the first, second and third kind and even abductions.  For this task he must travel to Ceará, Brazil, in the cities of Quixadá and Quixeramobim, known as "Area Q".

It is during investigations that Thomas meets João Batista, a man who has many answers about what is happening in this area and also about his son.  Gradually, he begins to realize that he is about to experience the greatest discovery of his life.

Cast
 Isaiah Washington as Thomas Mathews
 Murilo Rosa as João Batista
 Tania Khalill as Valquiria
 Ricardo Conti as Eliosvaldo
 Leslie Lewis Sword as Carol Matthews
 Jordan Jones as Peter Mathews
 Jenny Vilim as Cynthia

References

External links
  
 
 

2011 science fiction films
2010s English-language films
Alien abduction films
American science fiction films
Brazilian science fiction films
Films shot in Ceará
Films shot in Los Angeles
2010s Portuguese-language films
2010s American films
2011 multilingual films
American multilingual films
Brazilian multilingual films